The Rashtriya Khel Protsahan Puruskar is a sports honour of the Republic of India. The name of the award in Hindi translates to National Sports Promotion Award. It is awarded annually by the Ministry of Youth Affairs and Sports. The award recognizes the "involvement of corporates, voluntary organizations, and sports control boards, in the promotion and development of sports in the country" over the previous three years. The award was started in 2009 and the guidelines were revised in 2015. Since the revision, entities in four categories are awarded: Identification and nurturing of budding and young talent, Encouragement to sports through corporate social responsibility, Employment of sportspersons and sports welfare measures, and Sports for development. , the award comprises "a citation and a trophy in each of the categories".

, a total of 47 awards have been bestowed on 39 different organizations and individuals. The award is presented annually with the other five National Sports Awards and national adventure award at the Presidential Palace presented by the President of India, usually on 29 August of a year. Five organizations have won the award more than once. Services Sports Control Board won the award in 2010 in two categories, and once in 2012 and 2013, for a total of four awards. Tata Steel won the award in 2009 in two categories and again once in 2010 for a total of three awards. Two awards have been won by Railways Sports Promotion Board in 2009 and 2012, Petroleum Sports Promotion Board in 2011 and 2013, and Oil and Natural Gas Corporation in 2014 and 2020. Awards in two categories—establishment and management of sports academies of excellence, and financial support for sports excellence—were discontinued as a result of the 2015 award scheme revision. In the year 2021 this awarde was given to the Manav Rachna Educational Institutions(MREI),an Organisation for their contribution in the Identification and nurturing of the sports talent of over the past 25 years around the various parts of India.

List of recipients

Explanatory notes

Reference

External links

Official Website

 

Indian sports trophies and awards
Awards established in 2009
Ministry of Youth Affairs and Sports